
Year 388 BC was a year of the pre-Julian Roman calendar. At the time, it was known as the Year of the Tribunate of Capitolinus, Fidenas, Iullus, Corvus, Flavus and Rufus (or, less frequently, year 366 Ab urbe condita). The denomination 388 BC for this year has been used since the early medieval period, when the Anno Domini calendar era became the prevalent method in Europe for naming years.

Events 
 By place 
 Greece 
 King Agesipolis I leads a Spartan army against Argos. Since no Argive army challenges him, he plunders the countryside for a time, and then, after receiving several unfavorable omens, returns to Sparta.
 The Athenian general, Thrasybulus, sails to Lesbos, where, with the support of the Mytileneans, he defeats the Spartan forces on the island and wins over a number of cities. While still on Lesbos, however, Thrasybulus is killed by raiders from the city of Aspendus where his financial exactions have made him unpopular.
 Concerned about the revival of Athenian imperialist ambitions, the Persian King Artaxerxes II and King Agesilaus II of Sparta enter into an alliance. Sparta also seeks and gains the support of Dionysius I of Syracuse.

 By topic 
 Art 
 Plato, having left Athens on Socrates' death to visit Megara and possibly Egypt, travels to Syracuse at the invitation of Dionysius I's brother-in-law Dion.
 Aristophanes' play Plutus is performed.

Births

Deaths 
 Thrasybulus, Athenian general who helped overthrow the Thirty Tyrants

References